D'Entrecasteaux was an  of the French Navy launched in 1931. The ship was designed to operate from French colonies in Asia and Africa. She was posted at Madagascar, under Vichy French control during World War II.

During Operation Ironclad D'Entrecasteaux fought against the entire British Fleet involved in the landing operations for 36 hours, before finally being damaged and beached. While the other French surface ship, the armed merchant cruiser , was destroyed along with three submarines during the initial attacks, D'Entrecasteaux managed to dodge torpedoes and escape from the harbour at Diego Suarez.

The sloop managed to avoid damage from various bomb and torpedo attacks and continued to fight throughout the day. She escaped destruction because her shallow draft allowed her to see the torpedoes pass by underneath.

The British battleship  fired a few salvoes at her with no effect. However, on 6 May 1942, she was finally damaged during another Swordfish attack. The ship started to slowly take on water and was beached before she could sink. An officer and 15 sailors were killed during the attacks.

References

Bibliography

 

 

Bougainville-class avisos
Ships built in France
1931 ships
Maritime incidents in May 1942
Ships sunk by British aircraft